Royal National Park may refer to:
 Royal National Park in Australia
 Royal Manas National Park in Bhutan
 Royal National City Park in Sweden
 Mount Royal National Park in Australia
 Royal Natal National Park in South Africa
 Hlane Royal National Park in Eswatini
 Port Royal National Park in Honduras
 Royal National Park railway station in Australia